Smith River may refer to:

Rivers

Canada
 Smith River (Liard River tributary), British Columbia 
 Smith River (Montmorency River tributary), Québec
 Petite rivière Smith, a tributary

Jamaica
 Smith River (Jamaica)

United States
 Smith River (California)
North Fork Smith River (California), that begins in Oregon
 Smith River (Montana)
 Smith River (Pemigewasset River tributary), New Hampshire
 Smith River (Umpqua River tributary), Oregon
 Smith River (McKenzie River tributary), Oregon
 Smith River (Virginia), in Virginia and North Carolina

Places
 Smith River, British Columbia, Canada
 Smith River, California, United States

See also